Undercover is a 2021 South Korean television series directed by Song Hyun-wook and starring Ji Jin-hee, Kim Hyun-joo, Jung Man-sik, and Heo Joon-ho. Based on BBC drama series of the same name, it portrays the story of Han Jeong-hyeon (Ji Jin-hee), an agent at the National Intelligence Service, and a Human Rights lawyer, Choi Yeon-soo (Kim Hyun-joo). It aired on JTBC on Fridays and Saturdays at 23:00 (KST) from April 23 to June 12, 2021. The series is also  available on streaming media TVING in South Korea. Kim Hyun-joo and Ji Jin-hee previously starred together in Miss Kim's Million Dollar Quest (2004) and I Have a Lover (2015).

The series ended on June 12, 2021 with viewer ratings of 5.2% nationwide and 6.1% in the metropolitan Seoul area. It is its own best ratings achieved during its run.

Synopsis
Han Jeong-hyeon (Ji Jin-hee) is an agent of the National Intelligence Service (formerly the Agency for National Security Planning), who has been hiding his identity for the past 30 years as a father and owner of bicycle repairing shop. Choi Yeon-soo (Kim Hyun-joo), his wife and a Human Rights lawyer, becomes the first Director of the Corruption Investigation Office (CIO). These characters are trying to uncover the truth, pitted against a huge force holding a top position. The series tests their relationship as husband and wife when the secret life of Jeong-hyeon comes to light.

Cast

Main

 Ji Jin-hee as Han Jeong-hyeon/Lee Suk-kyu
 Yeon Woo-jin as young Han Jeong-hyeon/Lee Suk-kyu
 Lee Seok-kyu is agent at the National Intelligence Service, formerly the Agency for National Security Planning. He was selected as the new agent of NIS when he was in a police academy. At first he was tasked to spy on Choi Yeon-soo under pseudonym of Han Jung-hyun in order to take down Kim Tae-yeol who was targeted by NIS, eventually both of them were in mutual love and got married. Years later, he lives a peaceful life with his family until one day an NIS agent named Do Yeong-geol comes back to his life and he is enlisted to take down his own wife, Choi Yeon-soo.
 Kim Hyun-joo as Choi Yeon-soo
 Han Sun-hwa as young Choi Yeon-soo
 A human right lawyer for more than 20 years. She passed her bar test at the age of 20. A righteous person, she consistently seeks justice for years to Hwang Jung-ho for 20 years after he was unjustly being jailed. She joined a mass protest with Kim Tae-yeol, Kang Choong-mo and others to protest against the corrupted South Korean government who failed in protecting Hwang Jung-ho's innocence. In one of a chaotic protest against the government, she met Lee Suk-kyu, under pseudonym of Han Jung-hyun. Both of them were ended in mutual love, without her knowing who Suk-kyu was, therefore getting married with him. Years later, because of her consistency in defending Hwang Jung-ho, she is promoted as the Corruption Investigation Office for High-Ranking Officials by the government. However due to this promotion, her husband is tasked to stop her.
 Jung Man-sik as Do Yeong-geol, Han Jeong-hyeon's former senior at the National Intelligence Service, formerly Agency for National Security Planning 
 Park Doo-sik as young Do Yeong-geol
Heo Joon-ho as Im Hyeong-rak, director at the National Intelligence Service

Supporting

Family of Han Jeong-hyeon and Choi Yeon-soo 
 Yoo Seon-ho as Han Seung-goo
 Suk-kyu/Jeong-hyeon and Yeon-soo's autistic older son. He has an obsession with bicycles, therefore he helps his father operate their bicycle repair shop.
 Lee Jae-in as Han Seung-mi
 Suk-kyu/Jeong-hyeon and Yeon-soo younger daughter. A middle school student with maturity and intelligence beyond her age. She resembles her mother in everything
Park Geun-hyung as Lee Man-ho
 Lee Suk-kyu's father and a war veteran, being proud of his son who serves the country like he did in the past. He believes that Suk-kyu went to the US when actually he has to live under name of Han Jeong-hyeon. His health deteriorates as he waits for his son to come back to him. Since Suk-kyu cannot reveal his identity, he spends time with his father in the hospital, posing as a social worker. Man-ho never realizes that his son is always with him even until his death.

National Intelligence Service 

 Kwon Hae-hyo as Oh Pil-jae
 Joo Suk-tae as Park Won-jong
 Han Go-eun as Kim Do-hee/Ko Yoon-joo, an undercover agent
 Park Gyeong-ree as young Ko Yoon-joo
 Choi Dae-chul as Chu Dong-woo
Nam Sung-jin as Jo Dong-pal/Cha Min-ho

People around Choi Yeon-soo 

 Lee Han-wi as Bae Goo-taek
 Bae Yoon-kyung as Song Mi-seon
Kim Soo-jin as Min Sang-ah, Choi Yeon-soo's best friend in college, and a political reporter for a major media house
 Han Bo-bae as young Min Sang-ah
Choi Kwang-il as Hwang Jung-ho
Im Ji-kyu as young Hwang Jung-ho
 30 years ago, he was wrongly accused of a murder case and being sentenced to death. Therefore, while he was incarcerated on death row, Choi Yeon-soo is determined to seek justice for him as his lawyer. However his case hasn't got any shed of light for 30 years, even after his health severely deteriorated.  
Kim Hye-jin as Cha Min-ho's wife

Others 

 Lee Seung-joon as Kang Choong-mo, Choi Yeon-soo's good friend in college, now a high ranking government official working at the Blue House
 Hong Jin-gi as young Kang Choong-mo
 Kang Young-seok as Jung Cheol-hoon, a passionate detective
Park Jin-woo as Detective Gu
Son Jong-hak as Yoo Sang-dong
Song Young-gyu as Kwak Moon-heum, Chief Prosecutor
 Cha Soon-bae as Song Moon-bae, Chief Editor at Daehan Jeil Daily

Special appearances 
 Kim Young-dae as Kim Tae-yeol
 Kim Tae-yeol is a president of Hankuk University Student Council and leader of the mass protest against the government in 1991. Eventually he was accused as a communist and being targeted, then murdered by NIS.
Jang Eui-don as police university instructor (ep. 1)
Lim Jung-ok as Nurse Kim (ep. 1-2)
Kim Dong-ho as Cheon Woo-jin, Im Hyeong-rak's subordinate (ep. 2 & 8)
Jung In-gi as Kim Myung-jae, Secretary General of the Blue House
Kim Kyung-min as Mr. Park
Shim Hyung-tak as Lee Min-yool (ep. 3-4)
 A man who claims himself being intentionally beaten by Han Seung-goo so that Yeon-soo would be hindered to be the new chief of Corruption Investigation Office for High-Ranking Officials. Actually at that time, he abused his girlfriend and being caught by Seung-goo who said that a bigger person might not hit smaller person.
Park Joo-hyung as drug gang boss (ep. 4)
Kim Young-woong as subway control room staff (ep. 3)
Lee Se-na as Kim Da-kyung (ep. 4)
 Ex-girlfriend of Lee Min-yool. Being guilty with Seung-goo's situation, she confessed about what happened between her, Min-yool and Seung-goo to Yeon-soo.
 Seo Joon
 Lim Hyung-guk
 Ahn Se-ho as Kim Kwang-cheol, an assistant to Do Yeong-geol

Production

Development
In April 2020, the remake of the British miniseries was announced.

Casting
In July, JTBC confirmed that with the joining of Yeon Woo-jin and Han Sun-hwa the cast is completed: Ji Jin-hee, Kim Hyun-joo, Han Go-eun, Heo Joon-ho, Jung Man-sik, Kwon Hae-hyo, Park Geun-hyung, Lee Seung-joon, Lee Han-wi, Kim Soo-jin, Choi Dae-chul, Son Jong-hak, Song Young-gyu and Choi Kwang-il. This drama serves as a reunion project for Ji Jin-hee and Kim Hyun-joo after starring together in the 2015 drama I Have a Lover. It also reunites Ji Jin-hee and Heo Joon-ho who both starred in the 2019 drama Designated Survivor: 60 Days. Also reuniting in this series are Jung Man-sik, Choi Dae-chul and Choi Kwang-il who starred in the 2019 drama Vagabond.

Original soundtrack

Part 1

Part 2

Part 3

Part 4

Part 5

Part 6

Part 7

Special

Viewership

References

External links
  
 
 
 Undercover at Daum 
 Undercover at Naver 

JTBC television dramas
Korean-language television shows
2021 South Korean television series debuts
Television productions suspended due to the COVID-19 pandemic
South Korean television series based on British television series
Television series by Story TV
Television series by JTBC Studios
2021 South Korean television series endings